Bob Bryan and Mike Bryan were the defending champions but decided not to participate.
Alexander Peya and Bruno Soares won the title, defeating David Marrero and Fernando Verdasco in the final, 6–3, 6–2.

Seeds

Draw

Draw

External links
 Main draw

Doubles